Sorger is a surname of German origin. Notable people with the surname include:

Bob Sorger, Canadian television director
Craig Sorger (1990-2003), American murder victim
Peter Karl Sorger (born 1961), Canadian systems and cancer biologist

See also
Sorge (disambiguation)